The inaugural All African Games were held in Brazzaville, Republic of Congo in July 1965.

Medal summary

Men's events

Women's events

Medal table

External links
GBR Athletics

1965
African Games
1965 All-Africa Games
Athletics